House prices fluctuate over time. For more detailed articles referring to specific economies:

- Affordability of housing in the United Kingdom: House prices in the UK

- Real estate pricing: House prices in the United States

- Timeline of House Prices Sold in the United States